Audea melanoplaga is a moth of the family Erebidae. It is found in Botswana, Ethiopia, Kenya, Mozambique, Namibia, Somalia, South Africa, Tanzania and Zimbabwe.

References

Moths described in 1902
Audea
Moths of Africa